Vijay Kumar Roy is an academician, poet and editor from Bihar, India. Presently, he is working as an assistant professor of English at Northern Border University, Saudi Arabia

Bio

He earned his doctorate degree in English from Lalit Narayan Mithila University (LNMU), Darbhanga, Bihar, India.

Career

He started his career in 2008 as an Assistant Professor of English at SRM Institute of Science and Technology. Before working at Northern Border University, Arar, Kingdom of Saudi Arabia, he taught at Mizan–Tepi University, Ethiopia, and Shri Venkateshwara University.

Published Books
 Women’s Voice in Indian Fiction in English. New Delhi: Adhyayan Publishers, 2011. 
 Comparative Literature: Critical Responses.  New Delhi: Alfa Publications, 2014. 
 Contemporary Indian Spiritual Poetry in English: Critical Explorations. New Delhi: Alfa Publications, 2012. 
 Teaching of English: New Dimensions. New Delhi: Alfa Publications, 2012.
 Indian Poetry in English: A Comprehensive Study. New Delhi: Adhyayan Publishers, 2011. 
 Realm of Beauty and Truth: A Collection of Poems. New Delhi: Authorspress, 2016. 
 Aesthetic of John Keats: An Indian Approach. New Delhi: Adhyayan Publishers, 2010. 
 Value Education and Professional Ethics: An Anthology. New Delhi: Jnanada Prakashan, 2013.  
 Humanities and Social Sciences: The Quintessence of Education. New Delhi: Arise Publishers, 2012. 
 K. Sekhar’s Hindi - Speak with the Hearts of Indians. Addis Ababa, Ethiopia: Littmann Book, 2013.
 English Language Teaching: New Approaches and Methods. New Delhi: APH Publishing Corporation, 2013.  
 The Melodies of Immortality (An Anthology of Poetry). New Delhi: Alfa Publications, 2012. 
 Spiritual Poetry of India in English Translation. New Delhi: Alfa Publications, 2012. 
 Premanjali. New Delhi: Adhyayan Publishers, 2009 (2nd ed. 2012).  
 The Social, Cultural and Spiritual Dimensions of Modern Indian Poetry in English. Newcastle, United Kingdom: Cambridge Scholars Publishing, 2017.  
 Post-Independence Indian Poetry in English: New Experimentation. New Delhi: Alfa Publications, 2015.   
 Contemporary Indian Fiction in English: Critical Studies. New Delhi: Alfa Publications, 2013.

References 

Living people
20th-century male writers
21st-century male writers
Year of birth missing (living people)